Route 10, also known as the Lancaster Avenue Line, is a trolley line operated by the Southeastern Pennsylvania Transportation Authority (SEPTA) that connects the 13th Street station in Center City Philadelphia, Pennsylvania, to the 63rd Street–Malvern Avenue station in the Overbrook section of West Philadelphia. It is the least used subway-surface trolley line, but unlike Route 11, the most used subway-surface trolley line, it has overnight service.

Route description
Starting from its eastern terminus at 13th Street, Route 10 runs in a subway tunnel under Market Street. It has underground station stops at 15th Street, 19th Street, 22nd Street, 30th Street, and 33rd Street. From 15th to 30th Streets, it runs on the outer tracks of the Market Street subway tunnel used by SEPTA's Market–Frankford Line. Passengers may transfer free of charge to the Market–Frankford Line at 13th Street, 15th Street, and 30th Street and to the Broad Street Line at 15th Street. Connections to the SEPTA Regional Rail can be made at 30th Street. There is an underground passageway that connects the ex-Pennsylvania Railroad's 30th Street Station to the Market–Frankford Line's 30th Street subway station, but this has long been sealed off due to high crime. An underground passageway continues to serve between the 13th and 15th Streets stations and Jefferson Station and Suburban Station, respectively.

Route 10 exits the subway at the 36th Street Portal, where as the other subway–surface routes (11, 13, 34, and 36) surface at the 40th Street Portal. Route 10 then runs north on 36th Street, passing the former University City High School (now demolished) and University City Science Center as it approaches Lancaster Avenue (US 30). At Lancaster Avenue there is a wye cutback, which at one point connected to the former subway–surface trolley Route 38 to Lancaster Avenue when the Route 10 Line continued straight down Lancaster Avenue to Market Street, where it connected to a now-closed subway entrance at 23rd & Market Streets.

Continuing northwest on Lancaster Avenue, the Route 10 line crosses over 40th Street, where there is a southbound track which diverts Route 10 to 40th & Market Streets MFL station when the trolley subway tunnel is closed. At 41st Street there is a northbound track by which Route 10 returns from 40th & Market Streets Station. The tracks on 40th and 41st Streets continue north of Lancaster Avenue (part of the PTC Route 40 trolley line until September 9, 1956) to Girard Avenue and connect to the surface streetcar trolley Route 15.

Continuing northwest along Lancaster Avenue to 48th Street, Route 10 intersects Girard Avenue, where trolley Route 15 trackage joins that of Route 10; as Girard is offset by Lancaster Avenue, the two routes briefly share tracks before Route 15 turns left to continue up Girard Avenue.

At 52nd Street the line reaches Lansdowne Avenue, where another cutback loop exists, installed in 1996 for emergency or schedule adjustments only. Route 10 turns west on Lansdowne Avenue and at 60th Street, where now-abandoned tracks end just short of the line. These tracks once belonged to SEPTA Bus Route 46 when it was a trolley line (abandoned on August 11, 1957), and later served as pull-in/pull-out tracks for Route 10 before it was moved to SEPTA's Elmwood Depot. When Route 10 moved back to Callowhill Depot in the 2000s, trolleys pulled-in/pulled-out to Callowhill Depot via 63rd Street instead, using the outer end of Route 15 along with trackage which once belonged to the Route 41 trolley (abandoned on August 11, 1957, and now served by SEPTA Bus Route 31, another former subway–surface line until 1949). Route 10 turns north from Lansdowne onto 63rd Street, on which the line continues until it finally reaches the Malvern Loop, which has two (formerly three) tracks, sharing the off-street loop with SEPTA Bus Route 46.

History
Route 10 was established sometime before 1887. On December 15, 1906, the line was integrated into the subway–surface trolley system by the Philadelphia Rapid Transit Company and was extended to 63rd & Malvern Streets. In 1929, it was rerouted so that it went on Landsowne and 61st rather than on Girard, replacing part of Route 44.

In 2020, two route 10 trolleys collided in West Philadelphia, injuring 46.

In 2021, SEPTA proposed rebranding their rail transit service as "SEPTA Metro", in order to make the system easier to navigate. Under this proposal, the subway–surface lines will be rebranded as the "T" lines with a green color and numeric suffixes for each service and Route 10 would be renamed "T1 Lancaster Avenue." SEPTA described that "most comments were positive" in the public comment period for this rebranding project.

Stations and stops
All are located in the City of Philadelphia.

References

External links

Official SEPTA Route 10 schedule and map

10
Tram routes in Philadelphia